Rudy Verhoeff  (born 24 June 1989) is a Canadian male volleyball player. He is a member of the Canada men's national volleyball team and Swiss club Volley Amriswil, a participant in the 2016 Summer Olympics, a gold and silver medalist at the NORCECA Men's Volleyball Championship in 2015 and 2013, and a bronze medalist at the 2015 Pan American Games.

Personal life
Rudy Verhoeff was born in Calgary, Alberta to Paul and Cobi Verhoeff. He has three older siblings; Lance, Anya, and Lies, and he began playing volleyball at the age of 14. He is married with Kyla Richey.

Playing career

Club
Rudy was a member of the Trinity Western Spartans from 2007 to 2012. During his time there, he helped the team win back to back CIS Volleyball Championships in 2010/2011 and 2011/2012 season, while being named tournament MVP in 2011 and winning the Dale Iwanoczko Award for outstanding student athlete in 2012. Following the conclusion of his university volleyball career, Rudy spent a season with the Team Canada Full Time Training Center. He signed his first professional contract with French club Chaumont VB 52, helping the team to a 5th-place finish in the French League. The following season he signed with a different French side, GFCO Ajaccio. In 2015, Rudy signed with German team Düren. There, he was teamed up with fellow national team players Blair Bann and Jay Blankenau.

National Team
Rudy first joined the national team program in 2008 with the Canada men's junior national volleyball team. He helped the team win silver in the 2008 Junior NORCECA Championship, and qualify for the 2009 FIVB Volleyball Men's U21 World Championship.

He joined the senior national team in 2013. Rudy has helped the team win silver and gold at the Men's NORCECA Volleyball Championship in  2013 and 2015, respectively, as well as a bronze medal at the 2015 Pan American Games. In 2016, he helped the team finish 5th at the 2016 Summer Olympics.

Pro Volleyball

He played Pro Volleyball League in India in February 2019 for Chennai Spartans. He was the top scorer of the tournament.

Sporting Achievements

Club
 2009/2010  CIS Men's Volleyball Championship, with Trinity Western Spartans
 2010/2011  CIS Men's Volleyball Championship, with Trinity Western Spartans
 2011/2012  CIS Men's Volleyball Championship, with Trinity Western Spartans
 2019  Pro Volleyball League, with Chennai Spartans

National Team
 2008  Junior NORCECA Championship
 2013  NORCECA Championship
 2015  NORCECA Championship
 2015  Pan American Games

Individual
 2010/2011 CIS Men's Volleyball Championship - MVP
 2013 NORCECA Championship - Best Middle Blocker
 2013 NORCECA Championship - Best Blocker

References

1989 births
Living people
Canadian men's volleyball players
Pan American Games bronze medalists for Canada
Sportspeople from Calgary
Volleyball players at the 2015 Pan American Games
Volleyball players at the 2016 Summer Olympics
Pan American Games medalists in volleyball
Olympic volleyball players of Canada
Medalists at the 2015 Pan American Games